Yengi Kand-e Kandesaha (also Romanized as Yengī Kand-e Kandesahā; also known as Yengī Kand-e Majẕūmīn (Persian: ينگي کند مجذومين), Yengeh Kand and Yengī Kand) is a village in Golabar Rural District, in the Central District of Ijrud County, Zanjan Province, Iran. At the 2006 census, its population was 63, in 14 families.

References 

Populated places in Ijrud County